Response-rate ratio is a measure of efficacy of therapy in clinical trials. It is defined as the proportion of improved patients in the
treatment group, divided by the proportion of improved patients in the control group. The same term has been used in marketing.

Notes

Clinical research
Statistical ratios
Marketing research